Holding This Moment is a collection of Bane's early 7" releases with songs about straight edge and the hardcore scene.

Track listing
"In Pieces"  – 2:19
"Count Me Out"  – 2:30
"Both Guns Blazing"  – 5:36
"Superhero"  – 3:08
"At Best"  – 2:09
"Scared"  – 2:38
"Forked Tongue"  – 4:12
"Every Effort Made/Lay The Blame"  – 5:01

Original sources
This album is a compilation of songs released on previous 7" E.P.'s by Bane. Tracks 1-3 are from the Holding This Moment 7" (1998), tracks 4-6 are from the Free to Think, Free to Be 7" (1997), and tracks 7-8 are from the Bane 7" (1996), an album often referred to as the XXX 7".

"Both Guns Blazing" contains samples from the films The Good, the Bad, and the Ugly, Se7en and Unforgiven.

Members
 Aaron Bedard – vocals
 Aaron Dalbec – guitar
 Zach Jordan – guitar
 Pete Chilton – bass
 Ben Chused – drums (tracks 1–3)
 Damon Bellorado – drums (tracks 4–8)

External links
 Live video of the song "Count Me Out"

Bane (band) albums
1998 debut albums
Albums with cover art by Jacob Bannon
1998 compilation albums
Equal Vision Records compilation albums